The Department for Child Protection may refer to the following government departments concerned with child protection in Australia:

Department for Child Protection (South Australia)
Department for Child Protection (Western Australia)